Håkon Øvreås (born 1974) is a Norwegian poet and writer. 

He is best known for his debut work of children's literature, Brune (Brown, 2013), the first of a planned trilogy. The book was successful commercially and won numerous awards, among them: 
 the Norwegian Ministry of Culture's Literature Prize (Best Children's and Young Adults Book) in 2013 
 the Trollkrittet Prize (Norwegian children's/YA book writers' debut prize) in 2013
 the Nordic Council Literature Prize for Children and Young Adults in 2014
 the Dutch Zilveren Griffel (Silver Pencil) in 2015, 
 the German Luchs des Jahres (Best Children and YA Book) in 2016
 the 2020 Batchelder Award given by the American Library Association (given to Kari Dickson's English translation). 

Brune was also nominated for the Brage Prize 2013. The translation rights for the trilogy have been sold into 30 languages.

References

Norwegian writers
1974 births
Living people